Eipic ("epic"), styled as EIPIC, is a restaurant in Belfast, Northern Ireland. It was awarded a Michelin star in 2016 and retained that to present.

Head chef of EIPIC is Alex Greene. He took over from Danni Barry in late September 2017.

Awards
 Michelin star: since 2016

See also
List of Michelin starred restaurants in Ireland

References

External links
Official Site

Culture in Belfast
Michelin Guide starred restaurants in Ireland